Vladan Lipovina (born 7 March 1993) is a Montenegrin handball player for SC Magdeburg and the Montenegrin national team.

References

External links

1993 births
Living people
Montenegrin male handball players
Sportspeople from Cetinje
Expatriate handball players
Montenegrin expatriate sportspeople in Germany
Montenegrin expatriate sportspeople in North Macedonia
Montenegrin expatriate sportspeople in Spain
Montenegrin expatriate sportspeople in the United Arab Emirates
Rhein-Neckar Löwen players
HSG Wetzlar players
Handball-Bundesliga players
Liga ASOBAL players